The Red Sea sailfin tang or Desjardin's sailfin tang (Zebrasoma desjardinii) is a marine reef tang in the fish family Acanthuridae.

Description
Zebrasoma desjardinii grows to a maximum length of 40 cm (16 in), with sexual dimorphism producing males that are larger than females. This species shows the typical morphology of the family Acanthuridae. The body is oval or disc-shaped, with erectile and much elevated dorsal and anal fins. The coloration may vary from one individual to another and within the same individual, depending on age. In general, the upper side of the body alternates orange and dark blue vertical bands, with a larger blue band on the eyes, a spotted ventral region and numerous white spots on the head. The dorsal and anal fins have a pattern of horizontal alternate orange and blue bands. The caudal fin shows white spots and lines.

Like most surgeonfish on each side of the caudal fin, in the middle of the caudal peduncle, there is a defensive dark spine surrounded by a blue zone. This spine is hinged and may unfold to 80°.

In comparison to Zebrasoma veliferum, the adult Red Sea sailfin tang has fewer anal fin rays (22-24 instead of 23-26) and different markings on the tail. As a juvenile, the two species are almost indistinguishable in color and markings.

Behavior
Adults usually can be found in pairs, while juveniles are solitary. When threatened, these fishes display their large ventral and dorsal fins. They feed primarily on filamentous algae, various macroalgae and plankton. However, individuals were regularly observed feeding on jellyfish (Scyphozoa) and comb jellies (Ctenophora) in the Red Sea. They are pair spawners, a typical trait of other fish in the genus Zebrasoma. This differs from the group spawning typical of the family Acanthuridae.

Distribution
This species is widespread in the Indian Ocean from the northern Red Sea to KwaZulu-Natal Province in South Africa and as far east as India and Java.

Habitat
Red Sea sailfin tangs natively live in lagoons and reefs in a tropical climate. The juvenile fishes live in the inner reef areas. They prefer saltwater with a specific gravity of 1.020 - 1.025, a pH between 8.1 and 8.4 and an ideal temperature range of 22 - 26 C (72 - 78 F). They may live at water depths of 2 – 30 m (6.5 – 100 ft) or more.

In the aquarium 
The Red Sea Sailfin Tang is considered to be a moderately difficult fish to keep in captivity. Most Red Sea Sailfin Tangs kept in private aquaria are wild-caught as it is very difficult to breed them in captivity. They require a minimum tank size of 125 gallons (473 liters) and large quantities of live rock. They normally live for 5 to 7 years in captivity.

Bibliography
 Sprung, Julian y Delbeek, J.Charles. - The Reef Aquarium. Ricordea Publishing. 1994.
 Debelius, Helmut y Baensch, Hans A. Atlas Marino. Mergus. 1997.
 Michael, Scott W. (en inglés) Reef aquarium fishes. Microcosm.T.F.H. 2005.
 Nilsen, A.J. y Fossa, S.A. - Reef Secrets. TFH Publications .2002.

References

External links
  Aquabase

 

Acanthuridae
Fish described in 1836